Ironclads: High Seas (or IHS) – steam-ship period 3D tactical naval simulator focusing on fleet-scale battles in real time.
The game allows you to set up battles squadron groups, their formations and management, with realistic ship models and characteristics, as well as advanced ballistics and weapon models.

See also
Ironclads: American Civil War

References

External links 
 Official website

2009 video games
Real-time tactics video games
Windows games
Windows-only games
American Civil War video games
Naval video games
Video games developed in Russia